Gaudí usually refers to Catalan architect Antoni Gaudí.

Gaudi may also refer to:

 Antonio Gaudi (film), a 1984 film about Antoni Gaudí
 Gaudi (The Alan Parsons Project album), 1987
 Gaudí (Robert Rich album), 1991
 Gaudi (musician) (born 1963), Italian musician, composer and music producer
 10185 Gaudi, a main-belt asteroid
 Google Audio Indexing (GAudi), a Google product that indexes the audio of YouTube videos
 Gaudi script, a Brahmic script and the ancestor of the Bengali-Assamese script, Odia script and Tirhuta script

See also
 Gaudy
 Gauda (disambiguation)